Hardwick Lodge Meadow is a 10 hectare biological Site of Special Scientific Interest north-west of Wellingborough in Northamptonshire.

This unimproved grassland on boulder clay has a rich variety of flora, including many rare in the county. Crested hair-grass and salad burnet are found in drier parts, and a marshy area next to a stream has common spotted-orchid and the only population in Northamptonshire of heath spotted-orchid.

There is access by a footpath which crosses the field.

References

Sites of Special Scientific Interest in Northamptonshire